Hiram Corson (November 6, 1828 – June 15, 1911) was an American professor of literature.

Life
Corson was born in Philadelphia, Pennsylvania. He held a position in the library of the Smithsonian Institution, Washington, D.C. (1849-1856), was a lecturer on English literature in Philadelphia (1859-1865), and was professor of English at Girard College, Philadelphia (1865-1866), and in St. John's College, Annapolis, Maryland (1866-1870). In 1870-1871 he was professor of rhetoric and oratory at Cornell University, where he was professor of Anglo-Saxon and English literature (1872-1886), of English literature and rhetoric (1886-1890), and from 1890 to 1903 (when he became professor emeritus) of English literature, a chair formed for him. His papers are held at Cornell University.

Works
 Chaucer's Legende of Goode Women (editor). 1863.
 An Elocutionary Manual. Charles Desilver. 1864.
 Satires of Juvenal (translator). 1868.
 
 Jottings on the Text of Hamlet. 1874. (The reference to Jottings on the Text of Macbeth in the 1911 Encyclopædia Britannica article appears to be a mistake for Jottings on the Text of Hamlet.) 
 The University of the Future. 1875.
 
 
 
 The Aims of Literary Study. 1895.
 The Voice and Spiritual Education. 1896.
 Selections from Chaucer's Canterbury Tales (editor). 1896.
 An Introduction to the Study of Milton. 1899.
The voice and spiritual education. Macmillan. 1904.
He edited a translation by his wife, Caroline Rollin (d. 1901), of Pierre Janet's Mental State of Hystericals (1901).

Notes

References

Further reading
George Norman Highley, ed. The Corson family: a history of the descendants of Benjamin Corson, son of Cornelius Corssen of Staten Island, New York, H.L. Everett, 1906.

External links
 Brief biography about Hiram's life at Cornell
 
 
 

American literary critics
Writers from Philadelphia
Cornell University faculty
1828 births
1911 deaths
Smithsonian Institution people
19th-century American writers
20th-century American non-fiction writers
St. John's College (Annapolis/Santa Fe) faculty
19th-century American male writers
20th-century American male writers
American male non-fiction writers